Manca Jurič (born 18 January 1995) is a Slovenian handball player for RK Krim and the Slovenian national team.

She represented Slovenia at the 2021 World Women's Handball Championship in Spain.

References

External links

1995 births
Living people
Slovenian female handball players
People from Ljubljana
21st-century Slovenian women